"My Native Land" is poem wrote by Mongolian poet, writer, and playwright Dashdorjiin Natsagdorj. 

The poem mainly illustrates Mongolian nature beauty and scenery. The title refers to a "pasture-land" that may mean a "birthplace" or "homeland", or it may refer to Mongolia as a whole.

References 

Mongolian culture
Poems
20th-century poems